Ćopić is a surname. Notable people with the surname include:

Branko Ćopić (1915–1984), Bosnian Serb writer
Marko Ćopić (born 2003), Serbian footballer
Milan Ćopić (1897-1941), Yugoslav Croatian communist
Vladimir Ćopić (1891–1939), Croatian communist

See also
Ćupić

Croatian surnames
Serbian surnames